Hélène Laverdière (born April 13, 1955) is a Canadian politician. She was elected as the Member of Parliament (MP) for Laurier—Sainte-Marie in the 2011 election as a member of the New Democratic Party (NDP), defeating Bloc Québécois Leader Gilles Duceppe in his riding and retired at the 2019 election.

Laverdière obtained her Ph.D in sociology from the University of Bath, and briefly taught in the sociology department at the Université Laval. She subsequently entered Canada's Ministry of Foreign Affairs in 1992, serving in Washington, D.C., Dakar, Senegal and Santiago.

On July 9, 2018, Laverdière announced she would not run for a third term in the 2019 federal election. She told Le Devoir that she was due to turn 64 in 2019, and felt she needed to "pause for a little" and give "new blood" a chance to run.

Electoral record

References

External links
 
 

1955 births
Alumni of the University of Bath
Canadian diplomats
Canadian educators
Women members of the House of Commons of Canada
Canadian women diplomats
French Quebecers
Living people
Members of the House of Commons of Canada from Quebec
New Democratic Party MPs
Politicians from Saguenay, Quebec
Women in Quebec politics
21st-century Canadian politicians
21st-century Canadian women politicians
Academic staff of Université Laval